Looney Tunes Super Stars' Road Runner & Wile E. Coyote: Supergenius Hijinks is a DVD containing 15 Wile E. Coyote and the Road Runner cartoons which was released on October 4, 2011. It was released earlier in the Czech Republic on September 8, 2011 and on October 3, 2011 it was available early in the U.S. at Walmart stores.

The DVD contains 15 shorts, all of which star the Road Runner and Wile E. Coyote. Some of them have previously been released on DVD in some fashion, with an asterisk denoting those shorts. The shorts will be presented in both fullscreen and widescreen aspect ratios, similar to Looney Tunes Super Stars' Foghorn Leghorn & Friends: Barnyard Bigmouth. Like the rest of the Super Stars releases, there are no special features or extras.

It has been previously reported that the disc would include three Road Runner/Wile E. Coyote webtoons, Freeze Frame and Soup or Sonic. However, an update on February 2 reported that the disc would instead include the three 2010 CGI shorts Coyote Falls, Fur of Flying, and Rabid Rider.

Contents

Reception 
Some collectors were disappointed that the DVD set featured primarily on the less well-received DFE-era Coyote/Road Runner cartoons (particularly the Rudy Larriva-directed ones) and lacked Chuck Jones' Coyote/Road Runner cartoons from the "classic" (pre-1964) era.

See also 
 Looney Tunes Golden Collection - the previous series of DVD releases

References 

Looney Tunes home video releases
Wile E. Coyote and the Road Runner